Islamic Capitalism was active during the Islamic Golden Age and Muslim Agricultural Revolution, where an early market economy and form of merchant capitalism took root between the 8th–12th centuries.  A vigorous monetary economy was based on a widely-circulated currency (the dinar) and the integration of monetary areas that were previously independent. Business techniques and forms of business organisation employed during this time included contracts, bills of exchange, long-distance international trade, forms of partnership (mufawadha) such as limited partnerships (mudharaba), and forms of credit, debt, profit, loss, capital (al-mal), capital accumulation (nama al-mal), circulating capital, capital expenditure, revenue, cheques, promissory notes, trusts (see Waqf), savings accounts, transactional accounts, pawning, loaning, exchange rates, bankers, money changers, ledgers, deposits, assignments, the double-entry bookkeeping system, and lawsuits. Organizational enterprises independent from the state also existed in the medieval Islamic world, while the agency institution was also introduced. Many of these early capitalist concepts were adopted and further advanced in medieval Europe from the 13th century onwards. Some have argued that these economic activities laid the foundations for the development of modern capitalism.

Market economy

A market economy was established in the Islamic world on the basis of an economic system resembling merchant capitalism. Capital formation was promoted by labour in medieval Islamic society, and financial capital was developed by a considerable number of owners of monetary funds and precious metals. Riba (usury) was prohibited by the Qur'an, but this did not hamper the development of capital in any way. The capitalists (sahib al-mal) were at the height of their power between the 9th–12th centuries, but their influence declined after the arrival of the ikta (landowners) and after production was monopolized by the state, both of which hampered the development of industrial capitalism in the Islamic world. Some state enterprises  still had a capitalist mode of production, such as pearl diving in Iraq and the textile industry in Egypt.

During the 11th–13th centuries, the "Karimis", an early enterprise and business group controlled by entrepreneurs, came to dominate much of the Islamic world's economy. The group was controlled by about fifty Muslim merchants labelled as "Karimis" who were of Yemeni, Egyptian and sometimes Indian origins. Each Karimi merchant had considerable wealth, ranging from at least 100,000 dinars to as much as 10 million dinars. The group had considerable influence in most important eastern markets and sometimes in politics through its financing activities and through a variety of customers, including Emirs, Sultans, Viziers, foreign merchants, and common consumers. The Karimis dominated many of the trade routes across the Mediterranean Sea, Red Sea, and Indian Ocean, and as far as Francia in the north, China in the east, and sub-Saharan Africa in the south, where they obtained gold from gold mines. Strategies employed by the Karimis include the use of agents, the financing of projects as a method of acquiring capital, and a banking institution for loans and deposits. Another important difference between the Karimis and other entrepreneurs before and during their time was that they were not tax collectors or landlords, but their capitalism was due entirely to trade and financial transactions.

Though medieval Islamic economics appears to have somewhat resembled a form of capitalism, some Orientalists also believe that there exist a number of parallels between Islamic economics and communism, including the Islamic ideas of zakat and riba. Others see Islamic economics as neither completely capitalistic nor completely socialistic, but rather a balance between the two, emphasizing both "individual economic freedom and the need to serve the common good." Others point out that Islam has an inherently capitalist nature and argue this most through respect for private property as the foundation of capitalism in Islam, as well as the historical fact that the Prophet Muhammad was an entrepreneur, a merchant.

See also 
 Islamic socialism
 Religious views on capitalism

References

Further reading
Peter Nolan (2009) Crossroads: The end of wild capitalism. Marshall Cavendish, 

Islamic economics
Capitalism
Capitalist systems
Economic liberalism
Ideologies
Social philosophy
Political economy